Headingley Parish Church or the Parish Church of St Michael and All Angels in Headingley, a suburban area of Leeds, West Yorkshire, England is a large Victorian Church of England parish church in the centre of the parish on Otley Road.

History

The parish of Headingley was carved out of the once very large parish of Leeds, which at the time also included the districts of Armley, Beeston, Bramley and Hunslet. The first church on the site was built on land given in about 1620 by John Savile. This church remained in place for 210 years and could hold 200 congregants.

The Industrial Revolution brought population booms to northern England and the population of Headingley increased to 2,000 warranting the creation of a vicarcy in 1849 and the building of a larger, 600-seater, church in 1838 (architect (R. D. Chantrell).

However, this church was not to last. Further increases in population meant that a new church was needed. Today's church is the third on the site and was consecrated in 1886.

With the growth in the local population a new parish of Far Headingley was created, and St Chad's Church, Far Headingley was built in 1868. The two churches have worked together in matters of child welfare. The Headingley Team of St Michael's and St Chad's have a tradition of undertaking welfare work dating back to the late 19th century until the Second World War when  St Chad's conducted a home for the friendless girls' societies in Leeds.  In recent years, for the two churches  hold early Sunday morning communion services alternately, and both participate in Churches Together in Headingley.

Building and associated buildings

The church was designed by J. L. Pearson, architect of Truro Cathedral. It was built from 1884 to 1886, and the north porch was added and the spire completed in 1890. It is built of gritstone with a tiled roof, and is Grade II* listed. The church wall and gate piers are Grade II listed.

The Parish Hall was built in 1834 or 1844 as the Headingley National School, and is Grade II listed, as is the former Parochial Institute in Bennett Road, built in 1877 by George Corson and now used as offices.

Services

Worship at the church is in the liberal catholic tradition of the Church of England, with both Sunday services being sung by the church's choir.

Sunday
10:00 am Parish Eucharist (Sung)
06:30 pm Evensong (Sung)
Tuesday

 08:00 pm Compline (Said)

Wednesday
10:30 am Holy Communion (Said)

Incumbents of Headingley

See also
List of new ecclesiastical buildings by J. L. Pearson

References

External links

 Church website
St Michael & All Angels, Headingley at achurchnearyou.com

Headingley
Grade II* listed churches in Leeds
Grade II listed churches in Leeds
Leeds, St Michael and All Angels Church
Headingley
Headingley, St Michael and All Angels Church
Churches completed in 1886
Rebuilt churches in the United Kingdom
19th-century Church of England church buildings
Gothic Revival architecture in Leeds